Eremodaucus is a genus of flowering plants belonging to the family Apiaceae. Its only species is Eremodaucus lehmannii. Its native range is Caucasus to Western and Central Asia.

References

Apioideae
Monotypic Apioideae genera
Taxa named by Alexander von Bunge